The Véronique River is a river in the Côte-Nord region of the province of Quebec, Canada. It flows into the Gulf of Saint Lawrence, opposite to Anticosti Island.

Location

The Véronique River drains Lake Véronique and Little Lake Véronique.
The mouth of the river is in the municipality of Baie-Johan-Beetz in Minganie Regional County Municipality.
The river enters the Gulf of Saint Lawrence in the northeast of the Baie Quetchou, just east of the Baie Johan-Beetz.
The Quetachou River enters the northwest of the same bay.

Basin

It lies between the basins of the Watshishou River to the east and the Quetachou River to the west.
It includes part of the unorganized territory of Lac-Jérôme as well as part of Baie-Johan-Beetz.
The river has low volume and the current is slow.
Donat Devost and his sons set up a sawmill on the Véronique River around 1953. 
Six years later the mill was sold to Lorenzo Tanguay. 
In 1969 Tanguay moved the sawmill to Lac Salé and closed the business.

Environment

A map of the ecological regions of Quebec shows the river in sub-regions 6j-T and 6m-T of the east spruce/moss subdomain.
The north of the Véronique valley has potential for use by moose (Alces alces), and traces of moose were found in the region in 1978 and 1979.
Beaver (Castor canadensis) is well represented in the river basin.
The Véronique River has low potential for Canada goose (Branta canadensis) and average potential for surface ducks and diving ducks.

Fish

The river is used by Atlantic salmon (Salmo salar), brook trout (Salvelinus fontinalis) and American eel (Anguilla rostrata).
Atlantic tomcod (Microgadus tomcod) has also been reported.
It is narrow, its bed is littered with trees and the vegetation along its course is dense, so it is not attractive for sport fishing.
It is not officially a salmon river, and does not have the physical characteristics preferred by salmon.
The bed of the river is clay and mud along almost its entire length.
However, juvenile salmon were found in samples in 1980 and 1984, so there must be some good spawning areas.

Citations

Sources

Rivers of Côte-Nord